St. Mary's Hospital Lacor, commonly referred to as Lacor Hospital, is a hospital in Gulu District, Northern Uganda.  It was founded by Comboni Missionaries and is administered and managed by Roman Catholic Archdiocese of Gulu.

Location
Lacor Hospital is located in Obiya West Village, Bardege Division, Gulu City, Gulu District, Acholi sub-region, Northern Uganda. The coordinates of Lacor Hospital are:2° 46' 3.00"N, 32° 15' 11.00"E (Latitude:2.767500; Longitude:32.253056).

Overview
The hospital serves as a general hospital for a significant percentage of the population of the city of Gulu and of Gulu District. It also serves as a referral hospital for many smaller hospitals in the region, as well as less well equipped and staffed hospitals in the country. Lacor Hospital is one of two teaching hospitals for Gulu University School of Medicine, the other being Gulu Regional Referral Hospital. St. Mary's Hospital Lacor is one of the best in East Africa.

History
Founded in 1959 as a 30-bed hospital, by July 2005 it had 483 beds.  It also includes a nursing school and other health worker training programs. The hospital maintains remote Level III Health Centers in Amuru, Opit and Pabbo with an additional 24 beds.  Each day the hospital hosts an average of 600 inpatients and their attendants, as well as 500 outpatients, for a daily total of about 2,000 individuals.  During the Lord's Resistance Army insurgency, between 2,000 and 10,000 women and children would crowd into the hospital compound every night, to avoid the night-time attacks and abductions by the Lord's Resistance Army.

During the violent and tyrannical reign of Idi Amin in the 1970s, the hospital was often caught in the crossfire. Throughout the 1980s, the hospital remained at constant risk as thugs repeatedly ransacked the compound, looking for drugs or petrol. Raiders kidnapped staff members and held them for ransom.

The first surgeons at the hospital were Lucille Teasdale-Corti and Piero Corti, who arrived in 1961. Teasdale-Corti later died, in 1996, of the AIDS she had contracted from a patient while performing surgery. Other notable employees include Matthew Lukwiya, who was instrumental in containing a 2000 outbreak of Ebola, before succumbing to the disease himself.

References

External links
  Location of Lacor Hospital At Google Maps
  Official Website
 Famous Canadian Physicians: Dr. Lucille Teasdale at Library and Archives Canada
 S Accorsi, M Fabiani, M Lukwiya, PA Onek, PD Mattei, and S Declich (2001) "The increasing burden of infectious diseases on hospital services at St Mary's Hospital Lacor, Gulu, Uganda", American Journal of Tropical Medicine and Hygiene, Vol 64, Issue 3, 154-158
 Amy Finnegan, "Dispatches: True Health Warriors", Rx for Survival from the Public Broadcasting Service, September 2005

Hospitals in Uganda
Hospital buildings completed in 1959
Hospitals established in 1959
Teaching hospitals in Uganda
Gulu
Gulu District
Acholi sub-region
Northern Region, Uganda
Catholic hospitals in Africa
1959 establishments in Uganda